Dyke is a surname. Notable people with the surname include:

 Edwin Dyke (1842–1919), English clergyman and cricketer
 Greg Dyke (born 1947), former Director General of the BBC and current Chairman of Brentford Football Club
 John Dyke (rugby player) (1884–1960), Wales international rugby union player
 John and Jennie Dyke, American aircraft designers
 William Dyke (1930-2016), mayor of Madison, Wisconsin
 Sir William Hart Dyke, 7th Baronet (1837–1931)

See also
Dykes (surname)
Van Dyke (disambiguation)